The 1998 OFC Nations Cup was held in Brisbane, Australia. The six participating teams were Australia and New Zealand who qualified as of right, Fiji and Vanuatu who qualified from the Melanesia Cup, and Tahiti and the Cook Islands who qualified from the Polynesia Cup. New Zealand beat an Australian team lacking most of their best internationals 1–0 in the final, while Fiji defeated Tahiti for third place.

Qualification

Melanesia Cup 1998

Fiji and Vanuatu qualified.

Polynesia Cup 1998

Tahiti and Cook Islands qualified.

Venues

Squads
See 1998 OFC Nations Cup squads.

Group stage

Group A

Group B

Knockout stage

Semifinals

Third place match

Final

Goalscorers

10 goals
 Damian Mori
4 goals
 Kris Trajanovski
 Vaughan Coveny
3 goals
 Paul Trimboli
 Esala Masi
 Gerald Quennet
2 goals

 Brad Maloney
 Rupert Ryan
 Jean-Loup Rousseau

1 goal

 Alvin Ceccoli
 Carl Veart
 Scott Chipperfield
 Troy Halpin
 Kameli Kilalwaca
 Shailend Lal
 Ulaisi Seruvatu
 Valerio Nasema
 Che Bunce
 Danny Hay
 Mark Burton
 Tinol Christie
 Harold Amaru
 Hiro Labaste
 Teva Zaveroni
 Edwin Rarai
 Peter Roronamahava

Own goal
 Heimana Paama (playing against New Zealand)
 Heath Dickinson (playing against Fiji)

References

External links
 Oceania Football
 RSSSF.  Retrieved 21 February 2010.

 
OFC Nations Cup tournaments
International association football competitions hosted by Australia
Nations
OFC Nations Cup
Soccer in Brisbane
1998 in New Zealand association football
September 1998 sports events in Australia
October 1998 sports events in Australia